Dalbergia hupeana, the hardy rosewood, is a species of flowering plant in the family Fabaceae, native to subtropical areas of Laos, Vietnam, southern and central China, and southwestern South Korea. In the wild it prefers to grow on forested or scrubby slopes. 

A tree reaching  with high heterozygosity, it is of economic significance as its wood is considered precious. It is used as a street tree in a number of southern Chinese cities.

References

hupeana
Flora of Laos
Flora of Vietnam
Flora of Southeast China
Flora of South-Central China
Flora of North-Central China
Flora of South Korea
Plants described in 1882